William Burden may refer to:

 William Burden (tenor), American tenor
 William Fletcher Burden (1830–1867), American industrialist
 William A. M. Burden Sr. (1877–1909), American football player and stock broker
 William Douglas Burden (1898–1978), American naturalist and author
 William A. M. Burden (1906–1984), American Ambassador to Belgium
 Doug Burden (William Douglas Burden, born 1965), American rower